Avonworth High School is a high school serving the northern boroughs and townships of the metro region of Pittsburgh, Pennsylvania. Neighborhoods served include Ben Avon, Ben Avon Heights and Emsworth, along with Ohio Township and Kilbuck Township.

References

Public high schools in Pennsylvania
Education in Pittsburgh area
Schools in Allegheny County, Pennsylvania